Basoda State was a former princely state in Central India, part of the Bhopal Agency during the British Raj with the capital at Haidergarh. It was also known as Nawab-Basoda or Haidargarh-Basoda in order to distinguish it from a place with the same name in Gwalior State. 

The state was established in 1753 by Muhammad Ahsanullah Khan, son of Muhammad Diler Khan, who founded the Kurwai State. In 1822 Basoda became a British protectorate. In 1947, Nawab Masood Ali Khan, signed the accession to the Indian Union.

See also
List of Pashtun empires and dynasties
List of Sunni Muslim dynasties
Political integration of India
Pathans of Madhya Pradesh

References

Vidisha district
Muslim princely states of India
Pashtun dynasties